Aurora Plaza is a 185 m high skyscraper in the Pudong financial district, Lujiazui, of Shanghai, China, that was completed in 2003. It is one of the more recognisable of the smaller towers in the Pudong skyline, due to its curved sleek facade, its former large "AURORA" logo and a large video screen projected onto the front of the building at night.

Gallery

References

External links 
Aurora Plaza at Emporis
Aurora Plaza at SkyscraperPage

Skyscraper office buildings in Shanghai

Office buildings completed in 2003